Konstantin Schad  (born 25 July 1987 in Rosenheim) is a German snowboarder, specializing in snowboard cross.

Schad competed at the 2010 and 2014 Winter Olympics for Germany. He was 33rd in the 2010 snowboard cross, not advancing to the elimination round. In the 2014 snowboard cross, he won his 1/8-round race, but finished 4th in his quarterfinal, not advancing, and finishing 13th overall.

, his best showing at the World Championships is 18th, in the 2011 snowboard cross.

Schad made his World Cup debut in February 2007. , he has one World Cup victory, at Valmalenco in 2011–12. His best overall finish was 4th, also in 2011–12.

World Cup Podiums

References

External links 
 
 
 
 
 

1989 births
Living people
Olympic snowboarders of Germany
Snowboarders at the 2010 Winter Olympics
Snowboarders at the 2014 Winter Olympics
Snowboarders at the 2018 Winter Olympics
People from Rosenheim
Sportspeople from Upper Bavaria
German male snowboarders
X Games athletes
Universiade medalists in snowboarding
Universiade gold medalists for Germany
Competitors at the 2011 Winter Universiade
21st-century German people